Sheffield United Football Club participated in League One, the third level of English football, during the 2014–15 season.

Kit
In April 2014, United announced that they had agreed a deal with German sportswear company Adidas to produce the team kit for the 2014–15 season and beyond, ending the club's previous association with Macron. This was followed in June with DBL Logistics being unveiled as the club's secondary shirt sponsor until 2016, and in July by the announcement of luxury car dealers, John Holland Sales as the club's main shirt sponsor. In September United released a third kit, featuring a yellow and black shirt, sponsored by Topspring. On 17 October, Sheffield United announced a two-year deal with local business Blue Portal Telecoms with their logo appearing on the shorts of the first team.

Season overview

Pre-season

On 16 May 2014, Sheffield United released their retained list; Darryl Westlake, Matt Hill, Shaun Miller, Sean McGinty, Elliott Whitehouse, Jasper Johns, Jordan Hodder and Jahmal Smith were all released. Chris Porter was also on the released list, however Nigel Clough confirmed that the club was still in negotiation with him over a new contract. The retained list also confirmed that Mark Howard, Bob Harris and Terry Kennedy had all had their contracts extended. Three days later United signed Jamal Campbell-Ryce on a two-year deal after his release from Notts County, and paid an undisclosed fee to Livingston for Marc McNulty who signed a three-year deal. On 5 June, United announced another double signing with Chris Basham joining on a three-year deal from Blackpool and South Yorkshire born Andy Butler joining on a two-year deal from Walsall. The subsequent week both Ben Davies and Chris Porter signed one-year deals, followed another week later by Tranmere Rovers midfielder James Wallace. As manager Nigel Clough continued to reshape his squad there was continued speculation around the future of defender Harry Maguire with reported interest from Hull City and Wolverhampton Wanderers, with offers of around £1.5 million being rejected by United. On 25 June, Febian Brandy was released halfway through his two-year contract, exactly a year to the day from him joining the club. The following week, striker Lyle Taylor was sold to Scunthorpe United for an undisclosed fee after only a year at Bramall Lane. Meanwhile, off the field, co-owner Prince Abdullah was appointed to a government role in his home nation of Saudi Arabia and as such stepped down from his position on the board, installing his advisor Jim Phipps as his replacement in the role of co-chairman.

July began with Callum McFadzean joining Burton Albion on a six-month loan deal, and with pre-season training underway, defender Craig Alcock was added to the squad on 15 July. Three days later another defender was added to the squad as Blackpool youngster Harrison McGahey was signed for an undisclosed fee. United kicked off their pre-season fixture list on 19 July but suffered a disappointing 4–0 defeat at Burton Albion with Callum McFadzean, on loan from the Blades, numbering amongst Burton's goal scorers.  A trip to Northampton Town the following week earned United a better result as they drew 1–1 with their hosts. On 25 July, George Long joined Oxford United on a six-month loan deal, while the same evening United recorded their first win of pre-season when they beat Scottish Premiership side Dundee 4–2 at Bramall Lane. On 29 July, incumbent Player of the Year,  Harry Maguire, was sold to Premier League side Hull City for £2.5 million after months of speculation about his future at Bramall Lane. The same evening the Blades suffered a narrow 1–0 home defeat at the hands of Huddersfield Town in the latest of their pre-season friendlies. Two days later United beat Turkish Süper Lig champions Fenerbahçe 2–1 in a charity friendly in aid of the Soma mine disaster, before completing their pre-season fixture list with a 2–0 loss to York City at Bootham Crescent on 2 August 2014. With the start of the new season imminent, on 4 August United signed experienced striker Michael Higdon from Dutch side N.E.C. Nijmegen for an undisclosed fee on a two-year contract.

August and September: Late goals and a slow start

United kicked off their league campaign with a lunchtime fixture in front of the television cameras.  With six of the summer signings making their competitive débuts for the Blades, United were edged out in a 2–1 defeat to Bristol City. Later that week youngster Louis Reed signed a three-year professional contract with the Blades, before United's first win of the season came in the first round of League Cup against Mansfield Town.  On 15 August, United announced the signing of defender Jay McEveley on a one year-deal and goalkeeper Iain Turner on a six-month deal, with striker Joe Ironside joining Alfreton Town on a one-month loan deal a day later. Back in the league United lost 1–0 away at Coventry City. The following match saw United earn their first three points of the season in a 2–1 victory away at Peterborough United. This was followed by a 1–0 home victory over Crawley Town. On 26 August, United progressed to the third round of the League Cup after beating West Ham United on penalties. Back in the league, United rounded off August with a 1–1 away draw at Preston North End with Jose Baxter getting his third goal in three league games.

Following the international break Andy Butler re-joined former club Walsall on an initial one-month loan, and academy product George Willis joined Bradford Park Avenue on a short-term deal. Returning the league action, United beat Rochdale 1–0 at Bramall Lane with Jamal Campbell-Ryce claiming his first goal for the club. On 16 September, the Blades secured an away victory Colchester United, winning 3–2 after coming from two goals down. On 20 September United's seven match unbeaten run came to an end away at Swindon Town in 5–2 defeat. Three days later, United returned to winning ways with a 1–0 away victory over Leyton Orient in the third round of the League Cup. United rounded off September with a 2–1 victory over Gillingham, scoring twice in the final two minutes to come from behind.

October and November: More late goals and Yorkshire derbys

October started with Paddy McCarthy joining United from Crystal Palace on an initial one-month loan. On 4 October, United lost 3–2 away at Chesterfield with Michael Higdon receiving a red card. The Blades' next match was in the Football League Trophy, winning 2–1 away at Hartlepool United on 7 October, two days before Diego De Girolamo joined York City on a short-term loan deal. Back in the league United needed late goals to come from behind again to record a 2–2 draw against Leyton Orient. Seven days later they were 2–0 victors in a televised away fixture against Bradford City as defender Bob Harris scored his first goal in the club's colours and Marc McNulty netted his fifth of the season. Three days later, United made it two wins on the bounce with a 2–0 home win against Yeovil Town. On 23 October, Andy Butler was sent out on loan to home-town club Doncaster Rovers until January. United made it three wins and three clean sheets in three games with a 1–0 victory away at Crewe Alexandra on 25 October as Stefan Scougall scored his first goal of the season. United rounded off October with a 2–1 away victory over Milton Keynes Dons thanks to a late brace from Michael Higdon, which sent United to the last eight of the League Cup in the fifth round.

November began with a 1–0 home defeat to local rivals Barnsley. On 4 November, Diego De Girolamo was recalled early from his loan spell at York City after fellow striker Michael Higdon had pulled his hamstring during training. On 8 November, United's first round FA Cup match resulted in a goalless draw away at Crewe Alexandra, meaning a replay of the match at Bramall Lane. On 12 November, United crashed out of the Football League Trophy in a 1–0 away loss to Walsall. On 13 November, it was confirmed that Paddy McCarthy's loan with United had been extended until the end of the calendar year. On 14 November, United signed 18-year-old striker Che Adams for an undisclosed fee from Ilkeston. United's first victory of the month came in a 1–0 win on 15 November in another Yorkshire derby away at Doncaster Rovers with United going down to ten men after Paddy McCarthy was shown the red card, then Mark Howard saved a penalty before Jamie Murphy scored at the other end; all in the space of under three minutes. On 18 November, United beat Crewe Alexandra 2–0 at Bramall Lane to progress to the second round of the  FA Cup thanks to a brace from Ryan Flynn. On 22 November, Joe Ironside joined Hartlepool United on loan, later that day United drew 1–1 at home with Oldham Athletic with substitute Jamal Campbell-Ryce rescuing a point in the second half after United conceded early on. On 25 November, it was confirmed that George Long had been recalled early from his loan spell after Oxford United manager Michael Appleton revealed that Long was no longer part of his plans and had dropped Long from the first team. On loan transfer deadline day on 27 November, Diego De Girolamo rejoined York City on loan with the deal set to expire on 4 January, whilst United completed the loan signing of summer target Chris O'Grady from Brighton & Hove Albion until the end of January 2015. The following day United completed the signing of Kieran Wallace from Ilkeston on a deal until the end of the season whilst academy product CJ Hamilton joined Mickleover Sports on a youth loan. That evening, United ended the month with a 1–1 draw at home to Notts County.

December and January: Cup Runs and Return of the Beard

December began with a 1–0 home loss to Milton Keynes Dons. The following weekend, United were 3–0 victors over Plymouth Argyle as Jose Baxter converted two penalties to send United to the third round of the FA Cup. On 13 December, Sheffield United's first ever senior match with Fleetwood Town ended in a 1–1 away draw as youngster Kieran Wallace made his professional début. On 16 December 2014, Marc McNulty scored the only goal in a 1–0 home victory over Southampton to send United to the semi-finals of the League Cup with youngster Che Adams making his senior début. Back in the league United had another draw, this time at home to Walsall on 20 December with Chris O'Grady scoring his first goal in United's colours. On 26 December, United's poor form in the league continued with a 2–1 away loss at Port Vale. On 29 December, Brighton & Hove recalled O'Grady from his loan spell at United due to a striker shortage. On 30 December, Sheffield United were fined £4,000 by The Football Association for failing to control the behaviour of coaching staff, in particular first-team coach Chris Morgan during the League Cup victory over Southampton. The following day, Joe Ironside returned from his loan spell at Hartlepool United.

January began with a 3–0 away victory over Queens Park Rangers of the Premier League with Jamal Campbell-Ryce scoring a second half brace. Paddy McCarthy returned to Crystal Palace at the start of January and on 6 January, Andy Butler was sold to hometown club Doncaster Rovers for an undisclosed fee. On 10 January, United beat promotion rivals Preston North End 2–1 at Bramall Lane with Marc McNulty scoring his tenth goal of the campaign. On 15 January, youngster Joe Ironside was released by United and joined Alfreton Town on an 18-month deal. On 16 January, youngsters Otis Khan and Julian Banton joined Matlock Town on loan. United's first loss of the calendar year came on 17 January at the hands of Milton Keynes Dons in a 1–0 defeat. On 21 January, Tottenham Hotspur took a 1–0 lead in the first leg of the League Cup semi-finals at White Hart Lane with Andros Townsend converting a penalty after Jay McEveley accidentally handled the ball in the box. On 22 January, Chris Porter joined Colchester United on an 18-month deal after being released by the Blades. On 23 January, United brought in two players from Nigel Clough's former club Derby County, midfielder Paul Coutts who signed for an undisclosed fee and former loanee from last season Kieron Freeman joined on a free transfer; both players signed two-and-a-half-year contracts. The following day United announced the signing of John Brayford from Cardiff City on a three-and-a-half year deal for an undisclosed fee. The same day, United drew 1–1 away at Preston North End in the fourth round of FA Cup, with Diego De Girolamo scoring his first goal for the club, earning a replay at Bramall Lane. 
In the League Cup semi-final second leg against Tottenham Hotspur on 28 January 2015 at Bramall Lane, with Spurs winning 1–0 at half time, Che Adams replaced Jamal Campbell-Ryce after 74 minutes and five minutes later he had scored his first goals for Sheffield United with two goals in just over two minutes, which would have taken the game to extra time had Christian Eriksen not scored his second goal of the match for Tottenham Hotspur in the 88th minute to win 3–2 on aggregate. On 30 January, Stephen McGinn joined Dundee on loan for the remainder of the season, youngster Jamie McDonagh joined Matlock Town on loan and Jason Holt joined United on loan from Heart of Midlothian for the rest of the season. The following day Jamie Murphy signed a new two-year contract and Terry Kennedy signed a new one-year contract however Diego De Girolamo declined a new contract with the club. Later that day, United rounded off January with a 2–0 home victory over promotion rivals Swindon Town with Jamie Murphy coming off the bench in the second half and scoring a brace.

February and March: Inconsistency

Transfer deadline day on 2 February saw two players leave Bramall Lane and one arrive. Stephen McGinn's loan to Dundee was made permanent after his United contract was cancelled by mutual consent and George Long went on loan to Motherwell for the rest of the season. Coming into Bramall lane saw Rochdale's Matt Done join United for an undisclosed fee on a two-and-a-half-year-deal. On 3 February, United were knocked out of the FA Cup in the fourth round replay as they lost 3–1 at home to Preston North End despite Jamie Murphy opening the scoring. Four days later, United lost 2–0 away at Gillingham with the Gills scoring two later goals. On 10 February, the Blades were 4–1 home victors over Colchester United with Jose Baxter scoring a brace, Matt Done scoring on his début and Jay McEveley scoring his first for the club; this was also the first time United had scored more than three at home since November 2012. On 13 February, Harrison McGahey joined Tranmere Rovers on a youth loan until the end of the season. On 14 February, United were 3–1 victors away at league leaders Bristol City with Matt Done scoring a brace with Jamie Murphy assisting on both occasions and scoring the third himself. After declining a new contract with United, on 17 February, Diego De Girolamo was loaned to York City for the remainder of the season. That evening, United were 2–1 victors away at Notts County with Matt Done scoring the winner making it four goals in three games since he joined. On 24 February, United were lucky to draw 2–2 at home to Coventry City as Jose Baxter was sent off for a foul early on and Coventry City took an initial 2–0 lead. United returned to winning ways in the next match on 24 February with a 2–1 away victory over Rochdale. On 26 February, Jamal Campbell-Ryce joined former club Notts County on loan for the rest of the season with the option of a recall after 28 days. On 28 February, the month ended with a 1–1 away draw at Crawley Town with Marc McNulty converting a late penalty to earn United a point.

March started with a 2–1 home defeat to Peterborough United on 3 March with the Posh scoring two very late goals to give them three points. On 6 March, Steve Davies joined United on loan from Blackpool for the rest of the season and Florent Cuvelier was loaned to Burton Albion for the remainder of the season. On 7 March, United suffered another 2–1 home defeat, this time at the hands of League One newcomers Fleetwood Town in their first ever visit to Bramall Lane. On 14 March, the Blades drew 1–1 away at Scunthorpe United with Keiron Freeman scoring his first goal for the club.

Players

Current squad
.

Out on loan

Left before the end of the season

Transfers and contracts

In

Summer

Winter

Loan in

Out

Summer

Winter

Loan out

Contracts
New contracts and contract extensions.

Season firsts

Player début
Players making their first team Sheffield United début in a fully competitive match.

Début goal

Players scoring their first goal for Sheffield United in a competitive fixture.

Competitive fixture
First ever meeting of the two clubs in a competitive fixture.

Stadia
First ever visit to a stadium for a competitive fixture

Squad statistics

Appearances and goals

|-
|colspan="16"|Players who left before the end of the season:

|}

Top scorers

United also benefited from one own goal in the Football League Cup, and one own goal in the playoffs.

Clean sheets

Penalties

Disciplinary record

International Call-ups

League One table

Matches

Key

League One

League One play-offs

FA Cup

League Cup

Football League Trophy

Pre-Season and friendlies

References

External links
 Sheffield United F.C. Official Website

Sheffield United F.C. seasons
Sheffield United